List of bishops of the Roman Catholic Diocese of Sion:

Late Antiquity
Bishops of Agaunum (Octodurum)

Early Middle Ages

Prince-bishops of Sion

Middle Ages

Western Schism
loyal to Avignon

loyal to Rome

Renaissance to early modern

Modern history

References

Sion
Sion
Bishops of Sion list
Bishops of Sion